Leicy María Santos Herrera (born 16 May 1996) is a Colombian professional footballer who plays as a midfielder for Spanish Liga F club Atlético Madrid and the Colombia women's national team. She was national champion with Iowa Central Community College.

References

External links 
 

1996 births
Living people
Women's association football midfielders
Colombian women's footballers
People from Córdoba Department
Colombia women's international footballers
2015 FIFA Women's World Cup players
Olympic footballers of Colombia
Footballers at the 2016 Summer Olympics
Pan American Games gold medalists for Colombia
Pan American Games medalists in football
Footballers at the 2019 Pan American Games
Footballers at the 2015 Pan American Games
College women's soccer players in the United States
Iowa Central Community College alumni
Primera División (women) players
Atlético Madrid Femenino players
Colombian expatriate women's footballers
Colombian expatriate sportspeople in the United States
Expatriate women's soccer players in the United States
Expatriate women's footballers in Spain
Colombian expatriate sportspeople in Spain
Medalists at the 2019 Pan American Games
Medalists at the 2015 Pan American Games